Eimert van Middelkoop (born 14 February 1949) is a retired Dutch politician of the Christian Union (CU) party and teacher. He is the chairman of the Institute for Multiparty Democracy since 20 January 2018.

Early life
After high school, van Middelkoop attended what is now Erasmus University, earning a B.A. in Sociology in 1971. In 1971 and 1972, he was a teacher at the Reformed Social Academy in Zwolle. He was exempt from military draft for being indispensable as staff member  of the Reformed Political League in the House of Representatives.

Politics
Van Middelkoop became a member of the House of Representatives in 1989, while affiliated with the Reformed Political League. Since 2000, he has been aligned with the ChristianUnion (ChristenUnie), which was the product of a fusion of the Reformatory Political Federation (RPF) and the Reformatory Political Federation (GPV). He specialised in foreign and military affairs, prepared the inquiry by the House of Representatives into the role of the Netherlands in the fall of Srebrenica. He lost his seat in the House of Representatives in the 2002 elections.

From 2003 until 2007, van Middelkoop was a member of the Senate of the Netherlands. In the 2006 elections, the ChristianUnion party doubled its seats and joined the fourth Balkenende cabinet. Van Middelkoop became Minister of Defence in 2007.

In September 2008, he told the Dutch opinion magazine, Vrij Nederland, that he would have been very unhappy to have joined the army. Because of this and other remarks, he received criticism from military labour unions, who said that Van Middelkoop had lost his credibility.

Decorations

References

External links

Official
  E. (Eimert) van Middelkoop Parlement & Politiek
  E. van Middelkoop (ChristenUnie) Eerste Kamer der Staten-Generaal

 
 
 
 

1949 births
Living people
Christian Union (Netherlands) politicians
Dutch nonprofit directors
Dutch nonprofit executives
Dutch political consultants
Erasmus University Rotterdam alumni
Members of the House of Representatives (Netherlands)
Members of the Senate (Netherlands)
Ministers of Defence of the Netherlands
Ministers without portfolio of the Netherlands
Officers of the Order of Orange-Nassau
People from Lansingerland
Reformed Churches (Liberated) Christians from the Netherlands
Reformed Political League politicians
20th-century Dutch civil servants
20th-century Dutch educators
20th-century Dutch politicians
21st-century Dutch civil servants
21st-century Dutch educators
21st-century Dutch politicians